A Pierringer release or Pierringer Agreement is a type of settlement agreement. In law, a settlement is a resolution between disputing parties about a legal case that is reached either before or after court action begins.

The origin of the case is the Wisconsin tort law case of Pierringer v. Hoger.

Features
A Pierringer Release has the following features:
 the settling defendant’s liability is segregated
 the satisfaction of the settling defendant’s liability to the credit of all parties to the litigation
 the plaintiff’s ability to continue with the action against the remaining defendants
 the plaintiff’s agreement that it will indemnify the settling defendant for any contribution sought from it by the non-settling defendant(s).

References

Sources
 Peter B. Knapp, "Keeping the Pierringer Promise: Fair Settlements and Fair Trials," 20 William Mitchell Law Review 1 (1994)

External links
 Multi-Party Settlements:  Breaking the Logjam (.pdf), Peter Cronyn & James Brown, November 2002.

Civil procedure